Srđan Spiridonović (born 13 October 1993) is an Austrian professional footballer. He plays as a left winger for Kauno Žalgiris.

Career
Born in Vienna into a family of Serbian descent, Spiridonović started his career at Austria Vienna. In summer 2014, he was signed by Italian Lega Pro club Vicenza. The club was accidentally selected to replace A.C. Siena in at the start of Serie B season. He wore no.11 shirt. On 29 January 2015 Spiridonović was farmed to Lega Pro club Messina in a temporary deal. His no.11 was also taken by Leonardo Spinazzola. In the next season he changed to wear no.20 shirt.

On 28 August 2015 he was signed by Admira Wacker Mödling for free.

Panionios
On 29 August 2017, he joined Superleague Greece side Panionios for 3 years, days after being released from Admira.
On 21 September 2017 he scored his first goal in 1-1 home win against PAS Giannina in the 2017–18 Greek Cup. Three days later he scored the third of four in a comfortable 4-1 win against AEL. On 14 October he opened the score in a dramatic 4-3 home loss against Olympiakos.
On 26 November, he scored the second goal giving the lead in a 2-2 home draw with rivals PAOK. On 9 December he scored in a 2-1 home win against Platanias. On 9 January 2018 he scored the only goal in an away Greek Cup win against OFI, which ensured his team's qualification for the quarter-finals. On 10 March 2018, Spiridonovic scored two second-half goals (48', 59') for experienced manager Michalis Grigoriou's team in a 2-2 home draw with Atromitos. On 29 April, Spiridonovic scored two second-half goals in a 2-1 away win against Platanias.

On 3 October 2018, he opened the score in a 2-0 home win against AEL in the 2018–19 Greek Cup. Following a brilliant scoring 2017-18 Superleague Greece season, Spiridonović scored his first goal of the 2018-19 season on 24 February 2019, taking advantage of an assist from Fiorin Durmishaj on the right wing,  slotting a low effort beyond Sokratis Dioudis in a 2-0 home win against Panathinaikos in his club's effort to avoid relegation. On 21 April 2019, he scored with a tap-in after a cross from Olivier Boumal, to seal a 2-1 home win against PAS Giannina.

Pogoń Szczecin
On 4 July 2019, he joined Ekstraklasa side Pogoń Szczecin after being released from Panionios for an undisclosed fee.

Red Star Belgrade
On June 23, 2020, he signed a 3-years contract with Serbian champions Red Star Belgrade. On January 25, 2021 he was loaned to Turkish side Gençlerbirliği on a six month loan.

On 6 August 2021, he returned to the Superleague Greece, joining Atromitos on a season long-loan.  The deal also includes an option to buy.

Kauno Žalgiris
On 3 March 2023, Spiridonović signed for Lithuanian A Lyga club Kauno Žalgiris.

References

External links
 
 

Austrian footballers
Austrian expatriate footballers
FK Austria Wien players
L.R. Vicenza players
A.C.R. Messina players
FC Admira Wacker Mödling players
Panionios F.C. players
FK Kauno Žalgiris players
Austrian Football Bundesliga players
Austria under-21 international footballers
Austria youth international footballers
Serie B players
Serie C players
Super League Greece players
Serbian SuperLiga players
Austrian expatriate sportspeople in Italy
Austrian expatriate sportspeople in Greece
Austrian expatriate sportspeople in Poland
Austrian expatriate sportspeople in Serbia
Austrian expatriate sportspeople in Lithuania
Expatriate footballers in Italy
Expatriate footballers in Greece
Expatriate footballers in Poland
Expatriate footballers in Serbia
Expatriate footballers in Lithuania
Footballers from Vienna
Association football forwards
1993 births
Living people
Austrian people of Serbian descent
Red Star Belgrade footballers